The Magistrates Court of Western Australia is the first tier court in Western Australia, a state of Australia.  It has jurisdiction in respect of criminal and civil matters, as well as a range of administrative matters.  The court came into existence in May 2005 and was the result of the amalgamation of the Court of Petty Sessions of Western Australia, Small Claims Tribunal of Western Australia, and the Local Court of Western Australia.

History
The amalgamation of the three courts followed from recommendations made by the Law Reform Commission of Western Australia.  The amalgamation also occurred at a time when changes were made to the appointments of justices of the peace, appointment of magistrates and civil procedure in the state by widening the options available for enforcing bad debts.

The reforms envisaged that the jurisdiction of the court for civil claims would increase from $25,000 to $50,000 as well as the ability for the chief magistrate to establish divisions in the court to deal with specific classes of offenders, such as by establishment of a drug court or a family violence court.

Jurisdiction
The court is constituted under the Magistrates Court Act 2004 (WA).  It is an inferior court and it is also a court of record.  The court has a civil jurisdiction under the Magistrates Court (Civil Proceedings) Act 2004 (WA).  The court exercises the criminal jurisdiction which a court of petty sessions previously had or which a court of summary jurisdiction could have exercised prior to the creation of the court.  The court also deals with cases under the Restraining Orders Act 1997 (WA), the Dividing fences act, Disposal of uncollected goods and extraordinary drivers licence applications.  The court can also exercise any jurisdiction conferred upon it.

Composition

The Governor of Western Australia can appoint magistrates to the court.  The governor can also appoint a chief magistrate, as well as deputy chief magistrates.

The court normally sits with a magistrate sitting alone.  However, the governor may make a regulation which allows a single justice of the peace or two justices of the peace to sit as the court.

Caseload

About 43,000 civil cases are filed each year in the court.

References

Homepage of the court: http://www.magistratescourt.wa.gov.au/
Second Reading speech in the WA Legislative Assembly on 3 December 2003 http://www.parliament.wa.gov.au/hansard/hans35.nsf/NFS/366d64cc69626ae348256df70022dcec?
Magistrates Court Act 2004 (WA) http://www.austlii.edu.au/au/legis/wa/consol_act/mca2004214/

External links
 

Western Australian courts and tribunals
Courthouses in Perth, Western Australia
2005 establishments in Australia
Courts and tribunals established in 2005